Ouyang Feng is a fictional character in the wuxia novel The Legend of the Condor Heroes and its sequel, The Return of the Condor Heroes, by Jin Yong. He is the "Western Venom" of the Five Greats of the wulin (martial artists' community) during the Song dynasty, alongside Wang Chongyang, Hong Qigong, Huang Yaoshi and Duan Zhixing. Ouyang Feng is best known for his signature martial arts technique, the Toad Skill, and his expertise in toxicology. In the first novel, he is depicted as a ruthless villain who resorts to all sorts of unscrupulous means to achieve his goal of becoming the most powerful martial artist in the jianghu. He attempts to seize the Nine Yin Manual, a book detailing powerful martial arts and inner energy techniques, but is tricked into practising skills based on a corrupted version of the manual. He becomes insane eventually as a consequence, but his prowess in martial arts also increases tremendously in an unorthodox manner. In the sequel, Ouyang Feng accepts Yang Guo as his godson and teaches him the Toad Skill. Later in the novel, he dies in the midst of laughter and forgotten past feuds alongside his rival, Hong Qigong. He is buried on Mount Hua beside Hong Qigong by Yang Guo, who succeeds him as the "Western Eccentric" of the new Five Greats.

Fictional character biography

The Legend of the Condor Heroes 
Ouyang Feng is the master of a manor on Mount White Camel in the Western Regions. He specialises in toxicology and rears venomous snakes as pets. He participated in the first martial arts contest held on Mount Hua, emerged as one of the top five champions, and earned himself the nickname "Western Venom". He makes his first appearance while visiting Huang Yaoshi on Peach Blossom Island with his nephew, Ouyang Ke. He wishes to arrange for a marriage between his nephew and Huang Yaoshi's daughter, Huang Rong. However, Guo Jing contends with Ouyang Ke for Huang Rong's hand-in-marriage, with Zhou Botong and Hong Qigong supporting him. After a competition involving three rounds of tests between the two young men, Guo Jing wins the contest but incurs the displeasure of the Ouyangs.

Later in the novel, Hong Qigong, Zhou Botong and Guo Jing are stranded at sea and picked up by Ouyang Feng's ship. When Ouyang Feng realises that Guo Jing has memorised the Nine Yin Manual, he attempts to con and coerce him into writing a copy for him. However, acting on Hong Qigong's suggestion, Guo Jing deliberately writes a corrupted version of the manual for Ouyang Feng, with verses written in reverse manner. Ouyang Feng believes that he has gotten what he wants and tries to kill Guo Jing and Hong Qigong. Hong Qigong and Ouyang Feng fight on the ship, which sinks. Hong Qigong was poisoned by Ouyang Feng during the fight and loses all his inner energy after using it to purge the venom from his body. The now powerless Hong Qigong, accompanied by Guo Jing and Huang Rong, are at the mercy of the Ouyangs, because the five of them are stranded on an island. Huang Rong tricks Ouyang Ke into loosening a boulder, which falls and crushes his leg. Ouyang Feng forces the three of them to look after his nephew and provide them with food. In return, he promises not to harm them as long as they are still on the island. At one point, Ouyang Feng reveals that he is actually Ouyang Ke's biological father after having an affair with his sister-in-law. The Ouyangs are eventually picked up by Wanyan Honglie's ship.

After leaving the island, Ouyang Feng practises the Nine Yin Manual obsessively since he believes that the copy Guo Jing gave him is genuine. He kidnaps Huang Rong and tries to force her to interpret the verses for him, but she provides him with wrong information, without him knowing that he has been deceived. At the end of the novel, Ouyang Feng becomes insane due to practising the manual's skills wrongly, but his prowess in martial arts has also improved tremendously, and he defeats Guo Jing, Huang Yaoshi and Hong Qigong at Mount Hua.

The Return of the Condor Heroes 
Ouyang Feng makes a few brief appearances in the sequel. He is now insane and meets the young Yang Guo, whom he accepts as his godson without knowing that the boy is actually Yang Kang's son. Yang Guo learns the Toad Skill from Ouyang Feng and uses it on two occasions for self-defence against bullies, but refuses to tell the truth when Guo Jing and Huang Rong ask him how he learnt the skill. Ouyang Feng appears again when Yang Guo and Xiaolongnü are practising martial arts on Mount Zhongnan. Ouyang Feng wants to teach Yang Guo some skills but does not want Xiaolongnü to overhear him so he immobilises her. He enters a fit of insanity later and leaves.

Ouyang Feng appears one last time on Mount Hua, where he meets Yang Guo and Hong Qigong again. He fights with Hong Qigong again – this time for a period of four days. The fight is interrupted when Yang Guo comes at intervals to serve them meals. The animosity between the two rivals is too strong for them to bear and they continue to pit their inner energies against each other for a full day. Both of them suffer from exhaustion but they are unwilling to back down. They decide to use Yang Guo, who has been an observer for the past few days, as an intermediary. They teach him their respective skills and ask him to perform for each other to see.

Hong Qigong teaches Yang Guo his Dog Beating Staff Technique. Ouyang Feng has apparently lost after Yang Guo performed the last stance, No Dogs Under Heaven. Ouyang Feng spends the following night thinking of a countermove. The next morning, he asks Yang Guo to perform for Hong Qigong, who is shocked when he sees that Ouyang Feng has overcome his most powerful skill. Hong Qigong finally realises that there will be no eventual victor between the two of them. He laughs hysterically and embraces Ouyang Feng in defeat. At the same time, Ouyang Feng seems to have recovered from his insanity as he finally recognises Hong Qigong. The two rivals die together in the midst of laughter and forgotten past feuds. Yang Guo buries them side by side on Mount Hua.

Martial arts and skills
 Toad Skill is Ouyang Feng's signature martial arts technique. Its greatest weakness is that it can be overcome by a combination of Wang Chongyang's First Heaven Skill and Duan Zhixing's Yiyang Finger.
 Nine Yin Manual: Ouyang Feng is tricked into practising the conventional version of the manual's skills in a reverse manner. He becomes insane as a consequence, but his prowess in martial arts improves tremendously.
 Divine Serpent Fist is a type of fist style that involves snake-like twirling and curling movements to strike an opponent from various angles.
 Divine Serpent Staff Skill: Ouyang Feng wields an iron staff with a poisonous snake perched on it. His staff movements will cause the snake to bite his opponent at will and the snake's venom can cause immediate death.
 Thousand Li in One Moment is Ouyang Feng's qinggong.
 Force Reverse Meridian is Ouyang Feng's inner energy cultivation technique.
 Divine Camel Snowy Mountain Palm
 Bone Penetrating Dianxue Skill is a type of acupuncture point sealing technique.

In film and television 
Notable actors who have portrayed Ouyang Feng in films and television series include Lo Lieh (1983), Tony Leung (1993), Leslie Cheung (1994), Chu Tit-Wo (1994), Richard Low (1998), You Yong (2003) and Elvis Tsui (2008), Zong Fengyan (2014) and Heizi (2017) .

References 
  Tan, Xianmao (2005). Ouyang Feng: Too Smart to Fall for Any Tricks. In Rankings of Jin Yong's Characters. Chinese Agricultural Press.

Literary characters introduced in 1959
Jin Yong characters
The Legend of the Condor Heroes
The Return of the Condor Heroes
Condor Trilogy
Fictional toxicologists
Fictional wushu practitioners
Fictional murderers